"Arirang" is a Korean folk song. There are about 3,600 variations of 60 different versions of the song, all of which include a refrain similar to "Arirang, arirang, arariyo". It is estimated the song is more than 600 years old.

"Arirang" is included twice on the UNESCO Intangible Cultural Heritage list. South Korea successfully submitted the song for inclusion on the UNESCO list in 2012. North Korea also successfully submitted the song for inclusion in 2014. In 2015, the South Korean Cultural Heritage Administration added the song to its list of important intangible cultural assets.

The song is sung today in both North and South Korea, and represents the symbol of unity in the region that is divided by the Korean War.

History

Origin and etymology
It is believed that "Arirang" originated from Jeongseon, Gangwon Province. "Arirang" as a term today is ambiguous in meaning, but some linguists have hypothesized that "Ari" (아리) meant "beautiful" and "rang" (랑) referred to a "beloved one" or "bridegroom" in the ancient native Korean language. With the two words together, the term Arirang meant "My beloved one". This theory, supported by the scholars such as Shin Yong-ha, bears the song's legend. According to the legend, the name is derived from the story of a bachelor and a maiden who fell in love while picking Camellia blossoms near the wharf at Auraji — a body of water which derives its name from the Korean word "eoureojida" (어우러지다) that is closely translated to "be in harmony" or "to meet". For example, the body of water that connects the waters of Pyeongchang and Samcheok to the Han River is called Auraji. Two versions of this story exist:

 In the first one, the bachelor cannot cross the Auraji to meet the maiden because the water is too high, so they sing a song to express their sorrow. 
 In the second version, the bachelor attempts to cross the Auraji and drowns, singing the sorrowful song after he dies.

The Academy of Korean Studies also shares the same view that Arirang was originally the folk song of Jeongseon. Some locals of Jeongseon trace their folk song further back to the era of Goryeo.

Some believe that such song from Jeongseon spread to Seoul and other regions of Korea when the workers from Gangwon were sent to Seoul to rebuild the Gyeongbok Palace under the order of the Prince Regent Heungseon of the Joseon dynasty. Others especially theorize that the words "Arirang" and "Arari" in the song's lyrics originated from the families of the workers during this period who said "Arirang (아리랑, 我離郞)" or "Ananri (아난리, 我亂離)" to the officials taking the workers from their Gangwon homes to the palace construction in Seoul, the phrases which meant they cannot be separated from their lovers or families respectively. According to Maecheonyarok (매천야록, 梅泉野錄) recorded by the Joseon scholar Hwang Hyeon (1855-1910), it seemed the song was widespread in the country by this time.

The South Korean literary scholar Yang Ju-dong (1903-1977) theorized that the term "Arirang" came from the combination of "Ari" (아리), the old Korean indigenous word that also meant "long", and "ryeong" (領), the hanja character that meant "hill".

Some trace the term "Arirang" to the name of Lady Aryeong, the wife of the first king of Silla, as the song could have evolved from the poem praising her virtues. Others even speculate that the term is linked to the Jurchen word "Arin"  meaning  "hometown", or the name of the Indian god with similar name.

First recording
The first known recording of "Arirang" was made in 1896 by American ethnologist Alice C. Fletcher. At her home in Washington, D.C., Fletcher recorded three Korean students singing a song she called "Love Song: Ar-ra-rang". One source suggests that the students belonged to noble Korean families and were studying abroad at Howard University during the period in which the recording was made. Another source suggests that the singers were Korean workers who happened to be living in America during that time. The recordings are currently housed in the U.S. Library of Congress.

Resistance anthem
During the Japanese occupation of Korea from 1910 to 1945, when singing was censored heavily and it became a criminal offense for anyone to be singing any patriotic song including the national anthem of Korea, Arirang became an unofficial anthem. "Arirang" became a  resistance anthem against Imperial Japanese rule. Korean protesters sang "Arirang" during the March 1 Movement, a Korean demonstration against the Japanese Empire in 1919. Many of the variations of "Arirang" that were written during the occupation contain themes of injustice, the plight of labourers, and guerrilla warfare. It was also sung by the mountain guerrillas who were fighting against the fascists.

The most well-known lyrics to "Arirang" first appeared in the 1926 silent film Arirang, directed by Na Woon-gyu. Arirang is now considered a lost film but various accounts say the film was about a Korean student who became mentally ill after being imprisoned and tortured by the Japanese. The film was a hit upon its release and is considered the first Korean nationalist film.

Popularity in Japan
During the Japanese occupation of Korea, Japan experienced a craze for Korean culture and for "Arirang", in particular. Over 50 Japanese versions of "Arirang" were released between 1931 and 1943, in genres including pop, jazz, and mambo. Some Japanese soldiers were familiar with "Arirang" from their service in Japanese Korea, or from their interactions with forcibly conscripted Korean comfort women, labourers and soldiers.

Musical score

Lyrics
All versions of "Arirang" include a refrain similar to, "Arirang, arirang, arariyo." The word "arirang" itself is nonsensical and does not have a precise meaning in Korean. While the other lyrics vary from version to version, the themes of sorrow, separation, reunion, and love appear in most versions.

The table below includes the lyrics of "Standard Arirang" from Seoul. The first two lines are the refrain. The refrain is followed by three verses.

Variations

There are an estimated 3,600 variations of 60 different versions of "Arirang". Titles of different versions of "Arirang" are usually prefixed by their place of origin.

While "Jeongseon Arirang" is generally considered to be the original version of the song, "Bonjo Arirang" (literally: Standard Arirang) from Seoul is one of the most famous versions. This version was first made popular when it was used as the theme song of the influential 1926 film Arirang.

Other famous variations include "Jindo Arirang" from South Jeolla Province, a region known for being the birthplace of Korean folk music genres pansori and sinawi; and "Miryang Arirang" from South Gyeongsang Province.

Official status

China
In 2011, Arirang was added to the 3rd batch of "List of Representative Items of National Intangible Cultural Heritage of China'.

UNESCO
Both South Korea and North Korea submitted "Arirang" to be included on the UNESCO Intangible Cultural Heritage list. South Korea successfully submitted the song for inclusion in 2012. North Korea successfully submitted the song for inclusion in 2014.

South Korea
In 2015, the South Korean Cultural Heritage Administration added the "Arirang" to its list of important intangible cultural assets.

U.S. Army

The U.S. Army's 7th Infantry Division adopted "Arirang" as its official march song in May 1956, after receiving permission from Syngman Rhee, the first president of South Korea. The division had been stationed in Korea from 1950 to 1953, during the Korean War.

In popular culture

Music
 American composer John Barnes Chance based his 1962-63 concert band composition Variations on a Korean Folk Song on a version of "Arirang" that he heard in Korea in the late 1950s.
 In 2007, South Korean vocal group SG Wannabe released the album The Sentimental Chord which contains a song entitled "Arirang". The group is accompanied by Korean traditional instruments and the actual Arirang melody is played by an electric guitar during the bridge prior to the key change. They have since performed the song live with the National Traditional Orchestra of Korea and at several Arirang Festivals.
 The New York Philharmonic performed "Arirang" for an encore during its trip to North Korea on February 26, 2008.
 In November 2013, the student choir at Hankuk University of Foreign Studies performed "Arirang" in English, Chinese, Japanese, French, Italian, Spanish, German, Russian, Arabic and Korean.
The K-Pop group, A.C.E, performed "Jindo Arirang (Prehistory)" for the Revival of Arirang program on Arirang Culture. Their unique version that stayed true to the original song is also included on their new album, Changer: Dear Eris.
Another K-Pop group, KINGDOM, performed "Last flower(화월가 (밀양아리랑))", their own reinterpretation of Miryang Arirang, for the Korean traditional New Year music special “When Gugak Meets K-POP” aired on Arirang TV on January 13, 2023.

Films
 Arirang is the title of early Korean filmmaker Na Woon-gyu's influential 1926 film, which popularized the song "Arirang" in the 20th century.
 Arirang is also the title of a 2011 South Korean documentary. The film won the top prize in the Un Certain Regard category at the 2011 Cannes Film Festival.

Media
 Arirang TV and Arirang Radio are international English-language media stations run by the Korea International Broadcasting Foundation.

Sports
 North Korea's mass gymnastics and performance festival is commonly known as the Arirang Festival.
 At the 2000 Summer Olympics opening ceremony in Sydney, Australia, South Korean and North Korean athletes marched into the stadium together carrying the Korean Unification Flag while "Arirang" played.
 South Korean fans used "Arirang" as a cheering song during the 2002 FIFA World Cup.
 South Korean figure skater Yuna Kim performed to "Arirang" during her free skate in the 2011 World Figure Skating Championships, where she placed second.
 Parts of "Arirang" were used many times during the Pyeongchang 2018 Winter Olympics, especially during the Opening Ceremony and in the Olympic Broadcasting Services TV Intro. During the gala show of figure skating, Choi Da-bin skated to "Arirang".
At the 2018 Asian Games, "Arirang" was played when the Korea Unification Team won the gold medal in canoeing.
South Korean figure skater Haein Lee performed to "Arirang" during her free skate in the 2022 Four Continents Figure Skating Championship , where she placed second.

Video games
 Kim Wu's theme in Killer Instinct has elements of "Arirang", sung by Hoona Kim.
 "Arirang" is used as the Korean civilization's theme in Sid Meier's Civilization VI.
 "Horangi Arirang" is the name of Hwang's theme in Soul Calibur Soul Calibur.

See also
Arirang Mass Games

References

Intangible Cultural Heritage of Humanity
Korean traditional music
Korean-language songs
National symbols of Korea
South Korean folk songs
South Korea national football team songs
Korean traditions
Important Intangible Cultural Properties of South Korea